Loitokitok District was a former district in  Kenya. In 2010, it was merged into Kajiado County.

Location
The district was located in Rift Valley Province, in southeastern Kenya, at the border with the Republic of Tanzania, adjacent to Mount Kilimanjaro.

See also
Loitokitok Airport

References

External links
About "Ilkidotu Youth Group in Loitokitok District", A Community Development Group In Loitokitok District 
 About Loitokitok District Hospital

 
Former districts of Kenya
Mount Kilimanjaro